Kaigal water falls is situated in the Chittoor district of Andhra Pradesh state, India and is surrounded by the Koundinya Wildlife Sanctuary.

Name 
It is popularly known as Kaigal falls in reference to the Kaigal village situated about 2.5 kilometres from the Falls is located at 13.0690°N 78.5621°E.It has an average elevation of 633 meters (2,079 ft). Locally the falls is called as Dumukuralla Water Falls. The Telugu name Dumukurallu water falls came into Prominence because of its sound resembling the fall of stones from above

The kaigal water fall 
The waterfall is natural, perennial and water comes from a big rock at a height of 40 feet, irrespective of seasons. But its force and beauty is increased during the annual Monsoon season. There are several natural ponds below the falls. Its situation in a forest gives it an added advantage with natural unspoilt surroundings with plenty of exotic birds, shrubs, trees and wildlife. The falls is formed by the Kaigal stream which is one of the two streams to flow in the Koundinya Wildlife Sanctuary, the other being Koudinya stream.
And it is come under Theertham Panchaithi and Baireddipalli Mandal.

Visiting 
Kaigal village is situated on the Kuppam - Palamaner Highway. As you drive from Kuppam the village comes on the right site and the fall is about 2.5 kilometres from the village. There is a mud road leading to very close to the falls from where a short distance of walk will take you to the falls. Best season to visit is between June and October during the peak rain season. The falls is particularly popular picnic destination for people from surrounding areas. its very vast falls in AP. Find the link to the official tourist site here 

There is a board near the falls which is erected by Police dept. for "no trespassing". It is better seek out police assistance or approval before venturing into the waterfall.

External links
Bird Santury
AP Tourism
The falls is actually located between Devadoddi and Kaigal village. Nowadays, the buses halt at Kaigal. There is a painting of Lord Hanuman near the entrance. From here, one has to walk nearly two kilometres into the deep jungle. As you enter the valley, you have to cross the river and take a left turn before you see the water actually falling down.

Waterfalls of Andhra Pradesh
Geography of Chittoor district